Martha's Table (founded in 1980) is a non-profit organization, an active charity and volunteer center in the Washington, D.C., area.

History 
Martha's Table started in 1980 as a safe place for children to receive free sandwiches and food after school. The organization was named after the Martha of The Bible, a follower and friend of Jesus. While Martha's Table is not a religiously-based organization, the founders Veronica Maz, a social worker, and Father Horace McKenna, a Jesuit Priest, choose the name "Martha’s Table" to represent the dignity in being the one who serves.

Martha's Table gradually grew to address the additional needs of the community through its onsite early childhood education programs and expanded food distribution programs.

Veronica Maz (1980–1987) 
Veronica Maz served as the first president and CEO of Martha's Table. Maz was a sociology professor at Georgetown when she began working with Jesuit priest, Horace B. McKenna, in an attempt to turn concerns about poverty in the District into action.

Before founding Martha's Table, Maz worked with McKenna to create S.O.M.E. (So Others Might Eat), a soup kitchen to help feed the city's destitute citizens, and House of Ruth, a home for abused and neglected women. Maz realized that the city's children were not protected from the violence and drugs plaguing D.C. streets at the time, especially in the dangerous 14th Street corridor. She joined with McKenna once more to found Martha's Table, a haven where children could go after school for a meal and a place to read and play. In 1980, they named the agency Martha's Table. Together, the pair chose the name Martha from the Bible.

Veronica Parke (1987–2004) 
Satisfied that Martha's Table had reached organizational stability, Maz departed to pursue other endeavors. She was succeeded by long-time volunteer and change agent, Veronica Parke. Under Parke's leadership, the programs at Martha's Table expanded to serve children along the entire age spectrum, from 3 months to 18 years. The children's program expanded into three areas: a brand new daily program for preschoolers and their mothers focusing on learning and social skills; daily provision of breakfast, lunch, and snack; extensive education and play activities for children both during the school year and summer vacation, as well as activities on weekends. Programs were also created for youth in the critical preteen and teen years.

Lindsey Buss (2004–2012) 
After nearly two decades of  service to Martha's Table, Parke handed over leadership in 2004 to Director of Development Lindsey Buss. A lawyer and lifelong volunteer, Buss expanded enrollment access to students in the Child Development Center, creating a series of parenting workshops, and further developing the after-school program. Divided into three age categories, the after-school programs served as a way for students to focus on literacy and math enhancement, acquire tutoring or homework help, and participate in college-driven workshops.

Patty Stonesifer (2013–present) 
In April 2013, Martha's Table hired the former CEO of the Bill & Melinda Gates Foundation, Patty Stonesifer, as the new President and CEO. Upon taking her new position, Stonesifer feared what the overall reaction might be. "I was really worried that people would think I was a bit of a carpetbagger—that I just came in from outside and thought I knew everything," she said. Stonesifer joined the organization with the commitment to stand with DC residents in the struggle to end the cycle of poverty. Patty's vision for Martha's Table was illustrated using a model she employed from Jim Collins, author of Good to Great and the Social Sectors. "You have to decide what is real greatness and move that over to the nonprofit side," Stonesifer said. "And for me the biggest form of greatness is knowing what you're trying to do and being very—holding really tightly to that." Stonesifer's focus is on deepening and expanding Martha's Table to become a national model for service-based nonprofits, to help kids succeed in school, help parents contribute to their children's success, and end childhood hunger. Since joining the organization, Martha's Table has added a training center for parents with children enrolled in the organization's education programs, and piloted a mobile market partnership plan with Arcadia foods. The organization has also launched a number of pop up, free grocery markets throughout the city, and has teamed up with the Capital Area Food Bank on its Joyful Food Markets initiative, which brings fresh, healthy produced and groceries to elementary schools in Wards 7 and 8. Martha's Table also began collecting new data and employed new assessments for its data-based performance management.

Food

McKenna's Wagon 

McKenna's Wagon, the organization's mobile food truck, rolls out 365 days a year to feed the District's homeless and hungry population. The Wagon is named after the founder of Martha's Table, Horace McKenna. Volunteers stop at locations around the D.C. metro area and serve hot meals, sandwiches, homemade muffins, fresh fruit and refreshments. McKenna's Wagon also provides holiday meals during Easter, Thanksgiving, and Christmas. Churches, synagogues, workplaces, and schools work with Martha's Table to help run McKenna's Wagon by serving meals, donating food, making sandwiches, etc. Martha's Table's emergency food programs provide help to vulnerable populations by providing lunch and dinner daily to hundreds of homeless and low-income people, emergency grocery bags and weekday meals to 300 children and youth.

Martha's Markets 
Since August 2011, Martha's Table has partnered with Target to provide groceries to students and families at eight local elementary schools. Martha's Table also partners with schools in the District of Columbia and Maryland;  Garrison Elementary and Powell Elementary in the northwest, Browne Education Campus, Smothers Elementary, and John Burroughs Education Campus in the northeast, Amidon-Bowen in the southwest, Hendley in the southeast and Thomas Stone Elementary in Mount Rainier, Maryland.  Similar to the markets offered directly at Martha's Table, these "healthy grocery markets" are based on a choice model system that allows parents to select the nutritious foods their families need.

Mobile Markets 
During the school year, Martha's Table serves thousands of families through their "Martha's Market" choice grocery program set up in eight local elementary schools. These markets serve each school once per month, bringing free groceries and the opportunity for children and parents to fill their shopping bags with a variety of fresh produce and shelf-stable foods—all while enjoying cooking demonstrations, tastings, and information tables. On July 1, Martha's Table and Arcadia Foods launched a new weekly mobile farmer's market that offers a combination of free and for-sale produce and groceries to low-income families across the Metro D.C. area. Through this partnership, a bright, green truck full of fresh produce, proteins, and healthy diet staples is setting up pop-up farmer's markets Monday through Friday, twice each day, in eight neighborhoods currently receiving food support from Martha's Table. Because of this new partnership, the weekly mobile market program will provide reliable access to healthy groceries for families in eight locations throughout the summer—when children lose access to free and reduced-price meals at school.

Education

Early Child Education 
Martha's Table is a nationally accredited Child Development Center. It is a fully bilingual program for children ages 3 months to 3 years. The center explores a "Learn through Play" approach with its infants, toddlers and preschoolers. The educational components of the program are broad-based and teach the children about nature, reading, different cultures, science, art and computers. The Child Development Center also provides help to children with special needs through partnerships with other organizations, making sure that each child is either at the appropriate development level or receiving intervention services.

Elementary to Career Program (5–13 years) 
Nationally accredited through the National After-School Association, the after-school programs for younger children offers students a range of academic and enrichment opportunities, including tutoring, homework assistance, and developing literacy and math skills.

The enrichment program for elementary and middle school students focus on the following general areas:

 Helping meet children's basic needs such as food and clothing. 
 Providing a safe, supervised, and supportive program that promotes and nurtures learning, and addresses any special needs.
 Assisting children dealing with family challenges and engaging parents.
 Facilitating the participants' personal growth and development.

Opportunity

Martha's Outfitters 
Martha's Outfitters is a second-hand thrift store that originally started in 2004 as a clothes closet. Today, the store serves roughly 50,000 customers a year, generating more $425,000 in revenue. Martha's Outfitters also offers brand-name and vintage men's, women's and children's clothing, shoes, jewelry, housewares, accessories and linens at affordable prices. Revenue from purchases are dedicated to the education, food and clothing programs. Martha's Outfitters also offers a free clothing distribution program to clients referred by one of  the 100 agency partners throughout the Washington, D.C., area, allowing them access to free casual and work clothing, interview attire, housewares, and linens.

Recognition 
Martha's Table has been granted accreditation status through the National Association for the Education of Young Children (NAEYC) for their Child Development Center.

Charity Navigator gave Martha's Table a four-star rating in 2017.

References

External links 
 
 Bush Speaks at Martha's Table. CNN. December 20, 2001.
 

Charities based in Washington, D.C.
Educational charities based in the United States
Food banks in the United States